Forty Thieves or 40 Thieves may refer to:

 the story of Ali Baba and the Forty Thieves

Groups of people
 the Forty Thieves (New York gang), an 18th-century New York street gang
The Forty Thieves (New York City Common Council 1852–1853)
 the Forty Elephants, an all-female London criminal gang
 The nickname for the participants in the 1921 Cairo Conference

Games
 Forty Thieves (card game)

Ships
 The Vengeur-class ships of the line, whose notoriously poor construction caused them to become known as the "forty thieves."

Theatre, film and television
 The Forty Thieves, an 1878 British pantomime version of the Ali Baba story.
 The Forty Thieves, an 1869 burlesque performed on Broadway
 Forty Thieves, a 1944 Hopalong Cassidy Western film.

Music
"40 Thieves" (A Loss for Words song) redirect